The 1985 Cleveland Browns season was the team's 36th season with the National Football League.

This was the first of three consecutive AFC Central titles for the Browns. In Marty Schottenheimer's first full year as head coach, the Browns bounced back from a  5–11 season in 1984 to make the playoffs, despite a .500 season. Rookie quarterback Bernie Kosar led the Browns' offense; Ozzie Newsome's 62 receptions earned him a trip to the Pro Bowl; Earnest Byner and Kevin Mack each rushed for over 1,000 yards.

In the Divisional Playoffs, the Browns led the Miami Dolphins 21–3 in the third quarter, but in a scene that would be repeated 4 more times in the 1980s, the Browns collapsed down the stretch as the Dolphins came back to score three touchdowns to win the game 24–21.

In 2004, Football Outsiders named the 1985 Browns as one of the "worst playoff teams ever": 

Opponents outscored them 287–294, and they were blown out in two of their last three games (31–13 by the Seahawks and 38–10 by the Jets). They took a 21–3 lead over the Dolphins in the playoffs, only to watch Dan Marino and company score 21 unanswered points to win the game.

The 1985 Browns are probably best known for having two 1,000-yard rushers in Earnest Byner and Kevin Mack. Despite that impressive feat, the Browns were only fourth in the AFC in team rushing yards. They were 13th in the conference in passing yards, thanks to rookie [quarterback] Bernie Kosar and journeyman Gary Danielson. What that team did very well was play defense and take advantage of a weak division. The Browns swept the 5–11 Oilers and split with the 7–9 Bengals and Steelers. A 28–21 win in Week 15 against the Oilers proved to be the division capper: Kosar threw three TDs to open up a 28–7 lead, and the defense withstood a comeback driven by Warren Moon.

Until 2011, Cleveland's .500 winning percentage held the record for the lowest such percentage for a division winning playoff team in a non-strike season; the record was tied by the 2008 San Diego Chargers, then broken by the 2010 Seattle Seahawks. (Incidentally, in 1985 and 2008, teams with 11–5 records – Denver in 1985, New England in 2008—missed the playoffs.)

Personnel

Staff

Roster

Schedule

Note: Intra-division opponents are in bold text.

Postseason

Standings

Notes

References

External links 
 1985 Cleveland Browns at Pro Football Reference
 1985 Cleveland Browns Statistics at jt-sw.com
 1985 Cleveland Browns Schedule at jt-sw.com
 1985 Cleveland Browns at DatabaseFootball.com  

Cleveland
Cleveland Browns seasons
AFC Central championship seasons
Cleveland